In lichter Farbe steht der Wald is an EP released by electro-medieval/darkwave band Helium Vola. It was released November 22, 2004 by Chrom Records.

Track listing
 "In Lichter Farbe Steht Der Wald (Club-mix)" – 7:09
 "Dies Ire" – 6:18
 "Omnia Sol Temperat" – 4:03
 "Hold On" – 4:25
 "Carmen Ad Deum" – 5:06
 "In Lichter Farbe Steht Der Wald (Lied-Version)" – 5:29

Credits
Guitar - Robert Wilcocks
Harp - Uschi Lear
Hurdy-gurdy - Riccardo Delfino
Producer, keyboards - Ernst Horn
 Vocals - Andreas Hirtreiter (tracks: 1, 5, 6), Gerlinde Sämann (tracks: 1, 5, 6), Joel Frederiksen (tracks: 1, 2, 6), Sabine Lutzenberger, Susan Weiland (tracks: 1, 5, 6), Tobias Schlierff (tracks: 5)

External links 

2004 albums
Helium Vola albums